Hennemann is a surname. Notable people with the surname include:

Charles Hennemann (1866–1938), American track and field athlete
Franziskus Hennemann (1882–1951), German Roman Catholic missionary and Titular Bishop in South Africa
Marcelo Hennemann (born 1962), Brazilian tennis player

See also 
Henneman